Cyclarcha is a genus of moths of the family Crambidae. The genus was erected by Charles Swinhoe in 1894.

Species
Cyclarcha atristrigalis C. Swinhoe, 1894
Cyclarcha flavinervis C. Swinhoe, 1894

References

Pyraustinae
Crambidae genera
Taxa named by Charles Swinhoe